The 2020 American Cup was part of the World Cup circuit in artistic gymnastics.  It was the only All-Around World Cup help in 2020 as the others were canceled due to the worldwide COVID-19 pandemic. This was the final edition of the American Cup competition.

Background 
The American Cup was originally to be the first of four All-Around World Cups to be used as a way for countries to qualify an additional Olympic berth for the 2020 Olympic Games.  However, due to the COVID-19 pandemic, the remaining World Cups in Birmingham, Stuttgart, and Tokyo were originally postponed until 2021 after the postponement of the 2020 Summer Olympics.  However, in 2021 the World Cups were officially canceled and the Olympic berths were awarded to the top three countries from qualification during the 2019 World Championships.  For men's artistic gymnastics this was Russia, China, and Japan; for women's it was the United States, China, and Russia.

Participants 
The top 12 teams from the 2019 World Championships were allowed to send a competitor.  For women's artistic gymnastics, the Netherlands and Belgium opted not to send a competitor so 13th and 14th placed teams, Australia and Ukraine, were able to.  The athletes from Russia withdrew last minute; therefore replacement athletes were not able to be selected.

Results

Women

Men

Nastia Liukin Cup 

The 11th annual Nastia Liukin Cup was held in conjunction with the 2020 American Cup. Since its inception in 2010, the competition has always been held on the Friday night before the American Cup, in the same arena.

Medal winners

Notable competitors 
Former elite gymnasts and 2017 City of Jesolo Trophy competitors Olivia Dunne and Gabby Perea competed at the 2020 Nastia Liukin Cup.

References 

2020
2020 in sports in Wisconsin
2020 in gymnastics
2020 in American sports